Now That's What I Call Music! 37 was released on February 8, 2011. The album is the 37th edition of the (U.S.) Now! series. Seven tracks selected for the album were number-one hits on the Billboard Hot 100: "Love the Way You Lie", "Just the Way You Are", "Firework", "Raise Your Glass", "We R Who We R", "Only Girl (In the World)" and "Like a G6".

Now! 37 debuted at number one on the Billboard 200 albums chart with first week sales of 151,000, the biggest week for any US-released Now album since Now! 31 started at number one with 169,000 in July 2009.

Track listing

Reception

With several number-one pop hits, Andy Kellman of Allmusic calls Now! 37 "one of the most enjoyable Now volumes of the last few years."

Charts

Weekly charts

Year-end charts

References

External links
 Official U.S. Now That's What I Call Music website

2011 compilation albums
 037
EMI Records compilation albums